Haworthiopsis pungens, formerly Haworthia pungens, is a species of flowering succulent plant from the Eastern Cape Province, South Africa.

Description
A proliferous, caulescent succulent, with sharp smooth dark green leaves, that grow in five (and occasionally three) rows. It forms spreading clumps. 
In its appearance it most resembles Astroloba rubriflora or Haworthiopsis viscosa (although the leaves of H. pungens are smooth and the plants are less upright in form).

The species name "pungens" means "sharp-pointed", and refers to the leaf-shape.

Taxonomy
The species was formerly placed in Haworthia subgenus Hexangulares. Phylogenetic studies have demonstrated that subgenus Hexangulares is actually relatively unrelated to other haworthias (being more closely related to Gasteria). The species was therefore moved to Haworthiopsis.

Distribution
This vulnerable species occurs in two localities within a small area in Langkloof, near Joubertina, in the Eastern Cape Province, South Africa. Here it grows on rocky conglomerate west-facing slopes in fynbos vegetation.

References

pungens
Flora of the Cape Provinces
Endemic flora of South Africa